IMDI (ISLE Meta Data Initiative) is a metadata standard to describe multi-media and multi-modal language resources. The standard provides interoperability for browsable and searchable corpus structures and resource descriptions with help of specific tools. The project is partly based on existing conventions and standards in the Language Resource community.

The web-based Browsable Corpus at the Max Planck Institute for Psycholinguistics allows you to browse through IMDI corpora and search for language resources.

External links

Information about IMDI can be found at: 
 Max Planck Institute for Psycholinguistics IMDI webpage

Projects using IMDI:

 The Max Planck Institute for Psycholinguistics IMDI Metadata Domain (Browsable Corpus)
 CGN - The Spoken Dutch Corpus Project
 DAM-LR - Distributed Access Management for Language Resources
 DBD - Dutch Bilingualism Database
 DOBES - Documentation of Endangered Languages
 ECHO Case Study 4 - Sign Languages
 ECHO WP2 - Infrastructure and Technology
 INTERA WP2 - Integrated European language data repository Area

Metadata